Gran Hermano 9 was the ninth Spanish edition of the reality television show Big Brother. It was launched on September 21, 2008 and ended January 22, 2009, which lasted a total of 124 days.

Judit Iglesias is the winner.

In the 2010 season "Gran Hermano: El Reencuentro" (All Stars), Andalla, Amor, Melania and Piero returned to the house.

Amor later competed as an intruder in the sixth season of Secret Story Portugal. After 54 Days, she placed seventh.

Housemates

Nominations Table
As with previous series, Housemates nominated 3 other Housemates worth 3, 2, and 1 points. Identical Housemates Pamela & Conchi were considered one Housemate and used the name Rosa before they were revealed to be two separate people.

Notes

: As Andalla and Piero were thought to be evicted, they could not be nominated by their fellow Housemates. 
: Conchi/Pamela were exempt from nominations this week as they passed their secret task of keeping Andalla and Piero hidden in the secret room. As a new Housemate, Judit was also exempt from nominations this week. Because Andalla and Piero passed their secret mission of remaining undetected in the secret room, they were the only Housemates allowed to nominate this week. After the phone lines were opened David decided to walk from the House, his line was therefore closed. 
: Aramoga and Lucy entered the House shortly after Paula's eviction. This week, there will be no nominations. However, at the end of the week, all Housemates will vote on who should stay in the House. 
: As Dadi was in the secret room during nominations, he could not nominate or be nominated by his fellow Housemates. 
: Eneko was exempt from the nominations process this week because he was currently a guest in the Gran Hermano Argentina House. After the phone lines were opened Dadi decided to walk from the House, his line was therefore closed. 
: This week, there were no nominations. However, three previous Housemates (Amor, Karen, and Paula) and one new Housemate (Augustín) entered the secret room. Throughout the entire week, the public voted on who should enter the main House. On Day 54, it was revealed that Amor received the most votes. He then re-entered the House, fully eligible to win. 
: This week, Housemates nominated to save. The three or more Housemates with the least support would face the public vote. Because Amor had only recently returned to the House, she was exempt from the nominations process. 
: Amor, Andalla, and Melania originally faced the public vote. After the phone lines were opened Amor decided to walk from the House on Day 69, her line was therefore closed. It was then decided that the Housemate with the next highest point total would then face the public vote with Andalla and Melania. Because Judit and Rosa were tied, they both faced the public vote. 
: This week, each Housemate had a different twist that affected nominations. Ángela's nominations would be revealed to the House. Eneko was nominating to save, as opposed to evict. All nominations Judit received were voided. She then had to choose the Housemate that she thought would receive the fewest points. She would then receive the same points as the person she chose. Judit chose Eneko. Oliver was given the ability to allocate his 6 points in whatever order and amount he chose. However, he chose to stick with the regular 3-2-1 format. Rodrigo had to choose an ex-Housemate that would nominate on his behalf. He chose Melania. Rosa, as Head of House, could save one of the nominees. 
: This week, unbeknownst to the Housemates, all nominations cast for 3 points were voided by Big Brother. 
: For the final week, the public voted to win, rather than to evict.

Blind results
Blind results are shown during debate shows on Sundays.

2007 Spanish television seasons
GH 9